Philip Marsden, also known as Philip Marsden-Smedley (born 11 May 1961), is an English travel writer and novelist.

Born in Bristol, England, Marsden has a degree in anthropology<ref>Allston Mitchell,
 "Interview with Philip Marsden", The Global Dispatches...", 10 October 2012.</ref> and worked for some years for The Spectator magazine. He became a full-time writer in the late 1980s. He was elected as a Fellow of The Royal Society of Literature in 1996.

A review of his work by Guy Mannes-Abbott appeared in The Independent newspaper in November 2007.

He lives in Cornwall with his wife, the writer Charlotte Hobson, and their children.

Awards and honours
 1994: Somerset Maugham Award for The Crossing Place 1996: Elected as a Fellow of the Royal Society of Literature
 1999: Thomas Cook Travel Book Award for The Spirit-Wrestlers 2013: Honorary Fellowship awarded by Falmouth University
 2015: Rising Ground: A Search for the Spirit of Place shortlisted for Stanford Dolman Travel Book of the Year

Selected publications

 Historical and travel writing A Far Country: travels in Ethiopia, Century, 1990, The Crossing Place: a journey among the Armenians, HarperCollins, 1993,  (Somerset Maugham Award in 1994). This book is being currently translated into Spanish thanks to an Artist Residency granted by the Banff Centre in Alberta, Canada, and the Mexican National Fund for Culture and the Arts.The Bronski House: a return to the Borderlands, HarperCollins, 1995,  – "a story of multi-generational Polish exile involving Zofia Ilinska, friend, neighbour and poet"eCampus blurb: "More than half a century after fleeing the Russians and Nazis, the poet Zofia Ilinska, nee Bronski, went back to the little village of her birth, which was then in Poland but now is part of Belarus. Accompanied by her friend, the travel writer and author Philip Marsden, she was looking for her home, though hoping to find much more -- a key to her childhood, and to her family. Marsden narrates the story of Zofia's return movingly but without sentimentality. And when she gives him her mother's diary, and letters, he begins to peel away the layers of Bronski history. From Zofia's journey we move back in time to the beautiful, courageous Helena, Zofia's mother, whose own family had had to uproot itself during the catastrophic events of 1914. From this chronicle of lost times and displaced souls emerges a passionate, magnificent epic of mother and daughter, a stirring elegy for the worlds that our century has left behind, and an unforgettable testament to love's power to reconstruct and forgive."The Spirit-Wrestlers: a Russian journey, HarperCollins, 1998 (Thomas Cook Travel Book Award 1999)The Chains of Heaven: An Ethiopian Romance, HarperCollins, 2005, The Barefoot Emperor: An Ethiopian Tragedy, HarperPress, 2007,  (A life of Tewodros II).Aida Edemariam, "Birth of an empire: Aida Edemariam is moved by Philip Marsden's vivid exploration of the founding of Ethiopia, The Barefoot Emperor" (review), The Guardian, 12 January 2008.The Levelling Sea: The Story of a Cornish Haven in the Age of Sail, HarperPress, 2011, Rising Ground: A Search for the Spirit of Place, Granta, 2014, The Summer Isles: A Voyage Of The Imagination, Granta, 2019, 

 Novels The Main Cages, Flamingo, 2002,  -  set in Cornwall during the mid-1930s.

 Spectator anthologies Views from Abroad: the Spectator book of travel writing, edited by Philip Marsden-Smedley and Jeffrey Klinke, London: Grafton, 1988 Articles of War: the Spectator book of World War II, edited by Fiona Glass and Philip Marsden-Smedley, London: Grafton, 1989 Britain in the Eighties: the Spectator’s view of the Thatcher decade'' edited by Philip Marsden-Smedley, Grafton, 1989

References

External links
 Official website
 Philip Marsden at United Agents

English travel writers
21st-century English novelists
Fellows of the Royal Society of Literature
1961 births
Living people
Writers from Bristol
English male novelists
21st-century English male writers
English male non-fiction writers